Bonita Canyon is a box canyon on the western slope of the Chiricahua Mountains in southeastern Arizona, which lies at  in elevation and opens in a southwesterly direction into the Sulphur Springs Valley.

The canyon walls are capped with outcroppings of volcanic tuff and separated by a narrow valley about a quarter of a mile wide. Bonita Creek flows west through the northern edge of the valley, along the northern wall of the canyon. The valley is carpeted with a variety of wild grasses and forested with oak and Arizona cypress. Animal life includes mountain lions, bobcats, black bear, mule deer, various bird and reptile species, and much more. Jaguars have also been spotted in the canyon.

Bonita Canyon is now part of the Chiricahua National Monument and is also home to the Faraway Ranch Historic District, as well as a public campground. The headquarters for the Chiricahua National Monument is located just outside Bonita Canyon in the adjoining Madrone Canyon, near the Faraway Ranch.

See also

 List of rivers of Arizona

References

Canyons and gorges of Arizona
Coronado National Forest
Protected areas of Cochise County, Arizona